Monika Schnitzer (born September 9, 1961 in Mannheim) is a German economist and chair of comparative economic research at the Ludwig Maximilian University of Munich. She was the president of the Verein für Socialpolitik from 2015 to 2016 and is the chairwoman of the German Council of Economic Experts since 2022.

Education 
Schnitzer graduated with a diploma in economics from the University of Cologne in 1986. She went on to further study at the University of Bonn and received her doctorate (Ph.D.) in 1991. She was granted a habilitation at the same university in 1995.

Career 
The Ludwig Maximilian University of Munich appointed Schnitzer to her current position in 1996. 

In addition to her academic work, Schmitzer advised the German Federal Ministry of Economic Affairs and Energy and the European Commission from 2011 to 2020. From 2011 to 2019, she served as deputy chair of the Commission of Experts for Research and Innovation (EFI). She is a fellow of the European Economic Association.

Research and Position 
Schnitzer's research is mainly in Industrial economics and external trade. Some of her positions following ordoliberalistic views of economy, society and idea of man.

Other activities

Non-profit organizations 
 Centre for Economic Policy Research (CEPR), Member of the Steering Committee of the Competition Policy Research and Policy Network
 Center for European Economic Research (ZEW), Member of the Scientific Advisory Board
 Ifo Institute for Economic Research, Member of the Board of Trustees
 Max Planck Institute for Biological Intelligence, Member of the Board of Trustees
 Deutsches Museum, Member of the Board of Trustees

Editorial boards 
 German Economic Review, Member of the Board of Editors

Recognition 
 2005 – Order of Merit of the Federal Republic of Germany
 2012 – Bavarian Order of Merit
 2019 – Honorary Doctorate from Kiel University
 2022 - Gustav Stolper Prize

Personal life 
Schnitzer is married to fellow economist Klaus M. Schmidt. The couple has three daughters.

References

External links 

 Official website

Living people
1961 births
Academic staff of the Ludwig Maximilian University of Munich
University of Cologne alumni
University of Bonn alumni
Academic staff of the University of Bonn
German economists
Fellows of the European Economic Association
Recipients of the Cross of the Order of Merit of the Federal Republic of Germany